Rédené is a commune in the Finistère department of Brittany in north-western France. The poet Gérard Le Gouic winner of the 1973 Prix Breizh and the 1980 Prix Antonin-Artaud was born in Rédené.

Population
Inhabitants of Rédené are called in French Rédénois.

Map

Geography

Historically, the village belongs to Vannetais. The Rosgrand wood is a natural site situated in the north of the commune. It offers nice views of the river Ellé.

See also
Communes of the Finistère department
Entry on sculptor of local war memorial Jean Joncourt

References

External links

Official website 

Mayors of Finistère Association 

Communes of Finistère